Ana Lorena Sánchez Mondragón (born August 14, 1990, Mexico City, Distrito Federal, Mexico), is a Mexican-American actress. She is an actress, known for Relaciones peligrosas (2012), Cosita linda (2014), and Tierra de reyes (2015).

Biography 
Sánchez is well known for her role as Ana Lorena Rincón in the television series Cosita Linda and as Elizabeth Gomez in the drama series Relaciones Peligrosas. She was born in Mexico City and raised in McAllen, Texas. Sánchez stumbled upon her acting career by starring in her high school's one-act play as an extra. She was no stranger to the stage as she was already a dancer from the age of 6. It was the end of senior year when Sánchez decided to apply for college and major in Psychology and Communications when deep down she knew acting was what she wanted to pursue whole-heartedly. She is now a proud Los Angeles resident after getting her foot in the door by studying Meisner technique in Miami and getting three leading roles in the US market.

Filmography

References

External links 

 
 
 

1990 births
Living people
Actresses from Mexico City
People from McAllen, Texas
Mexican telenovela actresses
Mexican television actresses
Mexican film actresses
American film actresses
American telenovela actresses
American television actresses
American actresses of Mexican descent
Mexican emigrants to the United States
21st-century Mexican actresses
21st-century American actresses